MikroDatorn was a Swedish computer magazine. The first issue of MikroDatorn was published in 1978, which makes it one of the oldest computer magazines in Sweden (Datornytt, published by Nordpress and disestablished in 1991, was older). MikroDatorn was published on a monthly basis.

MikroDatorn focused on reviews of computer products. In 2011 the magazine merged with PC för Alla to form PC för Alla Extreme!.

References

External links
MikroDatorn

1978 establishments in Sweden
2011 establishments in Sweden
Defunct computer magazines
Defunct magazines published in Sweden
Magazines established in 1978
Magazines disestablished in 2011
Monthly magazines published in Sweden
Computer magazines published in Sweden
Swedish-language magazines